William Eggleston in the Real World is a documentary film about the photographer William Eggleston directed by Michael Almereyda and released in 2005.

Details
The film reveals the deep connection between William Eggleston's personality and his work, and also reveals his parallel commitments as a musician, draftsman and videographer. The film follows Eggleston on trips to Kentucky, Los Angeles, New York City and Memphis, where Eggleston lives.

The film was nominated for a Gotham Award for Best Documentary from the Independent Filmmaker Project at the Gotham Awards 2005.

Heather Parks and James Patterson were associate producers; Donald Rosenfeld and Alexis Zoullas were executive producers.

References

External links 

Palm Pictures - William Eggleston In The Real World
William Eggleston at Xavier Hufkens, Brussels

2005 documentary films
2005 films
American biographical films
Documentary films about photographers
American documentary films
Films directed by Michael Almereyda
2000s English-language films
2000s American films